Fraxinus, commonly called ash, is a genus of flowering plants in the olive and lilac family, Oleaceae. It contains 45–65 species of usually medium to large trees, mostly deciduous, though a number of subtropical species are evergreen. The genus is widespread across much of Europe, Asia, and North America.

The leaves are opposite (rarely in whorls of three), and mostly pinnately compound, though simple in a few species. The seeds, popularly known as "keys" or "helicopter seeds", are a type of fruit known as a samara. Some Fraxinus species are dioecious, having male and female flowers on separate plants but sex in ash is expressed as a continuum between male and female individuals, dominated by unisexual trees. With age, ash may change their sexual function from predominantly male and hermaphrodite towards femaleness ; if grown as an ornamental and both sexes are present, ashes can cause a considerable litter problem with their seeds. Rowans or mountain ashes have leaves and buds superficially similar to those of true ashes, but belong to the unrelated genus Sorbus in the rose family.

Etymology
The tree's common English name, "ash", traces back to the Old English æsc, which relates to the Proto-Indo-European for the tree, while the generic name originated in Latin from a Proto-Indo-European word for birch. Both words are also used to mean "spear" in their respective languages, as the wood is good for shafts.

Selected species
Species are arranged into sections supported by phylogenetic analysis:

 Section Dipetalae
 Fraxinus anomala Torr. ex S.Watson – singleleaf ash
 Fraxinus dipetala Hook. & Arn. – California ash or two-petal ash
 Fraxinus parryi Moran – Chaparral ash
 Fraxinus quadrangulata Michx. – blue ash
 Fraxinus trifoliolata

 Section Fraxinus
 Fraxinus angustifolia Vahl – narrow-leaved ash
 Fraxinus angustifolia subsp. oxycarpa  – Caucasian ash
 Fraxinus angustifolia subsp. syriaca 
 Fraxinus excelsior L. – European ash
 Fraxinus holotricha Koehne
 Fraxinus mandshurica Rupr. – Manchurian ash
 Fraxinus nigra Marshall – black ash
 Fraxinus pallisiae Wilmott – Pallis' ash
 Fraxinus sogdiana

 Section Melioides sensu lato
 Fraxinus chiisanensis
 Fraxinus cuspidata Torr. – fragrant ash
 Fraxinus platypoda
 Fraxinus spaethiana Lingelsh. – Späth's ash

 Section Melioides sensu stricto
 Fraxinus albicans Buckley – Texas ash
 Fraxinus americana L. – white ash or American ash
 Fraxinus berlandieriana DC. – Mexican ash
 Fraxinus caroliniana Mill. – Carolina ash
 Fraxinus latifolia Benth. – Oregon ash
 Fraxinus papillosa Lingelsh. – Chihuahua ash
 Fraxinus pennsylvanica Marshall – green ash
 Fraxinus profunda (Bush) Bush – pumpkin ash
 Fraxinus uhdei (Wenz.) Lingelsh. – Shamel ash or tropical ash
 Fraxinus velutina Torr. – velvet ash or Arizona ash

 Section Ornus
 Fraxinus apertisquamifera
 Fraxinus baroniana
 Fraxinus bungeana DC. – Bunge's ash
 Fraxinus chinensis Roxb. – Chinese ash or Korean ash
 Fraxinus floribunda Wall. – Himalayan manna ash
 Fraxinus griffithii C.B.Clarke – Griffith's ash
 Fraxinus insularis Hemsl. – Chinese flowering ash
 Fraxinus japonica  – Japanese ash
 Fraxinus lanuginosa – Japanese ash
 Fraxinus longicuspis
 Fraxinus malacophylla
 Fraxinus micrantha Lingelsh.
 Fraxinus ornus L. – manna ash or flowering ash
 Fraxinus paxiana Lingelsh.
 Fraxinus sieboldiana Blume – Japanese flowering ash

 Section Pauciflorae
 Fraxinus dubia
 Fraxinus gooddingii  – Goodding's ash
 Fraxinus greggii A.Gray – Gregg's ash
 Fraxinus purpusii
 Fraxinus rufescens

 Section Sciadanthus
 Fraxinus dimorpha
 Fraxinus hubeiensis Ch'u & Shang & Su – 湖北梣, Hubei qin
 Fraxinus xanthoxyloides (G.Don) Wall. ex DC. – Afghan ash

Ecology
North American native ash tree species are a critical food source for North American frogs, as their fallen leaves are particularly suitable for tadpoles to feed upon in ponds (both temporary and permanent), large puddles, and other water bodies. Lack of tannins in the American ash makes their leaves a good food source for the frogs, but also reduces its resistance to the ash borer. Species with higher leaf tannin levels (including maples and non-native ash species) are taking the place of native ash, thanks to their greater resistance to the ash borer. They produce much less suitable food for the tadpoles, resulting in poor survival rates and small frog sizes. 

Ash species native to North America also provide important habitat and food for various other creatures native to North America. This includes the larvae of multiple long-horn beetles, as well as other insects including those in the genus Tropidosteptes, lace bugs, aphids, larvae of gall flies, and caterpillars. Birds are also interested in black, green, and white ash trees. The black ash alone supports wood ducks, wild turkey, cardinals, pine grosbeaks, cedar waxwings, and yellow-bellied sapsuckers, with habitat and food (such as the sap being of interest to the sapsucker) among others. Many mammalian species from meadow voles eating the seeds to white-tailed deer eating the foliage to silver-haired bats nesting will also make use of ash trees.  

Ash is used as a food plant by the larvae of some Lepidoptera species (butterflies and moths).

Threats

North America 

The emerald ash borer (Agrilus planipennis), also called EAB, is a wood-boring beetle accidentally introduced to North America from eastern Asia via solid wood packing material in the late 1980s to early 1990s. It has killed tens of millions of trees in 22 states in the United States and adjacent Ontario and Quebec in Canada. It threatens some seven billion ash trees in North America. Research is being conducted to determine if three native Asian wasps that are natural predators of EAB could be used as a biological control for the management of EAB populations in the United States. The public is being cautioned not to transport unfinished wood products, such as firewood, to slow the spread of this insect pest.

Damage occurs when emerald ash borer larvae feed on the inner bark, phloem, inside branches and tree trunks. Feeding on the phloem prevents nutrients and water transportation. If the ash is attacked, the branches can die and eventually the whole tree can as well. Ways to detect emerald ash borer infestation include seeing bark peeling off, vertical cracks in the bark, seeing galleries within the tree that contain powdery substance, and D-shaped exit holes on the branches or trunk. Not all of these may be present, but any of these warning signs could be an indication of possible infestation.

Europe 
The European ash, Fraxinus excelsior, has been affected by the fungus Hymenoscyphus fraxineus, causing ash dieback in a large number of trees since the mid-1990s, particularly in eastern and northern Europe. The disease has infected about 90% of Denmark's ash trees. At the end of October 2012 in the UK, the Department for Environment, Food and Rural Affairs (Defra)  reported that ash dieback had been discovered in mature woodland in Suffolk; previous occurrences had been on young trees imported from Europe. In 2016, the ash tree was reported as in danger of extinction in Europe.

Uses

Ash is a hardwood and is dense (within 20% of 670 kg/m3 for Fraxinus americana, and higher at 710 kg/m3 for Fraxinus excelsior), tough and very strong but elastic, extensively used for making bows, tool handles, baseball bats, hurleys, and other uses demanding high strength and resilience.

Ash, particularly swamp ash because of its figure, is a choice of material for electric guitar bodies and, less commonly, for acoustic guitar bodies, known for its bright, cutting edge and sustaining quality. Some Fender Stratocasters and Telecasters are made of ash, (such as Bruce Springsteen's Telecaster on the Born to Run album cover), as an alternative to alder. 

Ash is a Tonewood commonly used in the manufacture of electric guitars. It exhibits a pronounced bright tone with a scooped midrange. It's lightweight, easy to work and sand, accepts glue, stain, paint and finish very well and is inexpensive. All this has made it a favourite of large factories mass producing instruments. The Fender musical instrument company has been continuously and uninterruptedly using Ash to make electric guitars since 1956. Swamp ash is used a lot in guitar building because of its figure. It is a choice of material for electric guitar bodies and, less commonly, for acoustic guitar bodies, known for its bright, cutting edge and sustaining quality. Some Fender Stratocasters and Telecasters are made of ash, (such as Bruce Springsteen's Telecaster on the Born to Run album cover), as an alternative to alder. 

Ash is also used for making drum shells.

Woodworkers generally consider ash a "poor cousin" to the other major open pore wood, oak, but it is useful in any furniture application. Ash veneers are extensively used in office furniture. Ash is not used much outdoors due to the heartwood having a low durability to ground contact, meaning it will typically perish within five years. The F. japonica species is favored as a material for making baseball bats by Japanese sporting-goods manufacturers.

Its robust structure, good looks, and flexibility combine to make ash ideal for staircases. Ash stairs are extremely hard-wearing, which is particularly important for treads. Due to its elasticity, ash can also be steamed and bent to produce curved stair parts such as volutes (curled sections of handrail) and intricately shaped balusters. However, a reduction in the supply of healthy trees, especially in Europe, is making ash an increasingly expensive option.

Ash was commonly used for the structural members of the bodies of cars made by carriage builders. Early cars had frames which were intended to flex as part of the suspension system  to simplify construction. The Morgan Motor Company of Great Britain still manufactures sports cars with frames made from ash. It was also widely used by early aviation pioneers for aircraft construction.

It lights and burns easily, so is used for starting fires and barbecues, and is usable for maintaining a fire, though it produces only a moderate heat. The two most economically important species for wood production are white ash, in eastern North America, and European ash in Europe. The green ash (F. pennsylvanica) is widely planted as a street tree in the United States. The inner bark of the blue ash (F. quadrangulata) has been used as a source for blue dye.

In Sicily, Italy,  sugars are obtained by evaporating the sap of the manna ash, extracted by making small cuts in the bark.The manna ash, native to southern Europe and southwest Asia, produces a blue-green sap, which has medicinal value as a mild laxative, demulcent, and weak expectorant.

The young seedpods of Ash trees, also known as "keys", are edible for human consumption. In Britain, they are traditionally pickled with vinegar, sugar and spices.

Mythology and folklore
In Greek mythology, the Meliae are nymphs associated with the ash, perhaps specifically of the manna ash (Fraxinus ornus), as dryads were nymphs associated with the oak. They appear in Hesiod's Theogony.

In Norse mythology, a vast, evergreen ash tree Yggdrasil ("the steed (gallows) of Odin"), watered by three magical springs, serves as axis mundi, sustaining the nine worlds of the cosmos in its roots and branches. Askr, the first man in Norse myth, literally means 'ash'.

In Italian folklore, an ash stake could be used to kill a vampire.

See also 
List of Lepidoptera that feed on ashes
Æ, the letter ash

References

External links

Cofrin  Center for Biodiversity Herbarium, University of Wisconsin, Trees of Wisconsin, Fraxinus comparison chart 
 

 
Oleaceae genera
Trees
Medicinal plants